Thorp High School may refer to:

Thorp High School (Thorp, Washington)
Thorp High School (Wisconsin)